Dynatocephala omophaea is a moth of the family Tortricidae. It is found in Nepal, Sikkim in northern India, Thailand, western Malaysia, Vietnam, Sumatra and Borneo.

References

Moths described in 1926
Archipini